Kambarasa also known as Stambha, was a member and prince of the Rashtrakuta dynasty. He was the eldest and first son of Dhruva Dharavarsha his illustrious father, and was given the governorship of the region of Gangavadi. He had always longed for the Rashtrakuta throne in his youth, and wanted the throne for himself after his father's death, but was defeated by his younger brother, Govinda III, but was spared by him, and once more was allowed to govern Gangavadi.

Struggle for the throne
According to the Navasari record, Kambarasa went to war having formed an alliance of twelve chiefs. Shivamara II of the Western Ganga Dynasty of Talakad had joined hands with Kambarasa, but after the defeat was  he imprisoned for a second time by the Rashtrakutas while Kambarasa was spared and pardoned by his younger brother, Govinda III, and was allowed to govern from Gangavadi again.

References

 Reu, Pandit Bisheshwar Nath (1997) [1933]. History of The Rashtrakutas (Rathodas). Jaipur: Publication scheme. .
 Kamath, Suryanath U. (2001) [1980]. A concise history of Karnataka: from pre-historic times to the present. Bangalore: Jupiter books. LCCN 80905179. OCLC 7796041.

Rashtrakuta dynasty